Rauschenberg is surname of:

Dane Rauschenberg (born 1976), American long-distance runner
Friedrich Wilhelm Rauschenberg (1853–1935), German architect
 (1879–1953), German politician
Robert Rauschenberg (1925–2008), American artist who came to prominence in the 1950s transition from Abstract Expressionism to Pop Art

See also

Rauschenberg (disambiguation)

Rauschenberger

German-language surnames
Jewish surnames